North Yorkshire Council is a future unitary local authority in England covering most of the ceremonial county of North Yorkshire. The new authority was approved by Parliament on 17 March 2022, and elections to the new council took place on 5 May 2022.  On 1 April 2023 the new council will assume responsibility for administrating the area currently administered by North Yorkshire County Council and the district councils of Craven, Hambleton, Harrogate, Richmondshire, Ryedale, Scarborough and Selby.

History

In October 2020 the Government invited the councils in the administrative area of North Yorkshire County Council and the unitary City of York Council to submit proposals for reorganisation into unitary local authorities. The county council proposed a single unitary council for its entire administrative area and no change to York. The district councils (except Hambleton) jointly proposed an eastern council combining the areas of Ryedale, Scarborough, Selby and York, and a western council including Craven, Hambleton, Harrogate and Richmondshire.

Following a public consultation, in July 2021 the Communities Secretary Robert Jenrick announced that the county council's proposal would be taken forward and the first elections for the new unitary authority would be held in May 2022.  The councillors elected then will serve one year as county councillors for the existing North Yorkshire County Council and then will continue on for another four years as councillors for the new unitary authority when it begins in April 2023.

Combined authority 
North Yorkshire County Council and the City of York Council have proposed that the new unitary authority will create a combined authority with the City of York Council.  In August 2022 the government and the two councils agreed proposals for a devolution deal, which will require the formation of a combined authority and election of a directly elected mayor for the combined authority.  The proposals are subject to a public consultation, and anticpate that elections for the first mayor would take place in May 2024.

See also

2019-2023 structural changes to local government in England
2022 North Yorkshire Council election

References

External links
 The new council for North Yorkshire

Local authorities in North Yorkshire
Local education authorities in England
Unitary authority councils of England
Politics of North Yorkshire
2023 establishments in England
Organizations established in 2023